James Hayward may refer to:
 James Hayward (writer), English writer on military, art and music history
 James Hayward (artist), American painter
 James Hayward (politician), member of the Western Australian Legislative Council
 Jimmy Hayward, film director, screenwriter and animator